T&C Surf Designs II: Thrilla's Surfari is a sequel to Town & Country Surf Designs: Wood & Water Rage for the Nintendo Entertainment System (NES) video game system.

Gameplay

The game features Thrilla Gorilla, a surfing/skateboarding mascot of the company, Town & Country Surf Designs, on a quest to save his girlfriend (Barbie Bikini) who has been kidnapped by a witch doctor named Wazula, as you find out in the opening scenes. Unlike the original game, which is set in Hawaii, the sequel is set in Africa. The game features levels such as jungles, deserts, waterfalls, rivers, and submerged caverns. Thrilla rides a skateboard through the jungle and desert levels, a surfboard through the river and waterfall levels, and a shark in the submerged cavern levels.

Gameplay involves steering Thrilla around obstacles, over pits and past creatures while collecting coconuts used in the shell game to gain extra lives, bananas to gain extra life, and powerups such as the handstand powerup which grants temporary invulnerability to all manners of danger but pitfalls. Enemies include elephants, giraffes, giant spiders, carnivorous plants, spear-wielding humans, snakes, electric eels, and many others.

References

External links
 Town & Country II: Thrilla's Surfari at UV List

1992 video games
Advergames
LJN games
Multiple-sport video games
Nintendo Entertainment System games
Nintendo Entertainment System-only games
North America-exclusive video games
Side-scrolling video games
Video game sequels
Video games set in Africa
Skateboarding video games
Surfing video games
Water sports video games
Video games about primates
Video games developed in the United States